Kaithal Pundri Karnal road is the highway and the road in Haryana, India. This is four line highway from karnal to kaithal. The road not only connects Kaithal, Pundri ,Nissing and Karnal but also connects Indian state of Punjab, Haryana and Uttar Pradesh.

References

Roads in Haryana